Radio Somos Pichilemu ("We Are Pichilemu Radio") is a radio station located in Pichilemu, Chile. It is owned by Andrea Natalia Aranda Escudero Somos Pichilemu Producciones E.I.R.L. and directed by Jorge Vargas González.

References

External links 

 Radio Somos Pichilemu

Radio stations in Chile
Mass media in Pichilemu
Organizations based in Pichilemu
Organizations established in 2007
2007 establishments in Chile